Symbatios or Symbatius is the Hellenized form of the Armenian name Smbat. It was particularly frequent in Byzantine times. People with this name include:

 Smbat IV Bagratuni, 6th-century Armenian general who served both Byzantium and Sassanid Persia
 birth name of Constantine, son and co-emperor of Leo V the Armenian
 Symbatios the Armenian, logothete and governor of the Thracesian Theme, rebel against Michael III in 866
 Symbatios the Great, Georgian ruler of Klarjeti in 870–899